Salawat Abdrakhmanovich Gallyamov (December 24, 1959 – September 5, 2018) was a Bashkir linguist, researcher, supporter of the theory of the Turanian origin of the Bashkir people. Gallyamov is known for his research in the field of the epics and myths of the peoples of Eurasia and the connections and linguistic parallels of the Bashkir language with ancient and modern languages.

Books 
 Эпосу «Урал-батыр» — 4 тысячи лет Уфа, ж-л «Шонкар», 1996
 Великий Хау Бен. Уфа, Госкомнауки РБ, 1997
 Башкорды от Гильгамеша до Заратуштры. Уфа, РИО РУМНЦ РБ,  : 1000, 1998
 Введение в сопоставительное изучение грамматики башкордского, кордского и английского языков. Уфа, РИО РУМНЦ РБ, 1999
 Кордско-Башкордско-Англо-Русский словарь. Уфа, РИО РУМНЦ РБ, 2000
 Основы Башкордской Индо-Германской философии, 2001–2003. В 4-х томах: Онтология, Гносеология.
 Башкордский язык и санскрит. М., СПб, 2003. 308 с.
 Башкордская философия. В 4 томах. Уфа: Китап, 2005. 
 Древние арии и вечный Курдистан. (Серия «Тайны древних цивилизаций») - М.: Вече. 2007 г., Твердый переплет, 555 стр.  Тираж: 3000 экз.

References

Linguists of Turkic languages
1959 births
2018 deaths
Bashkir scientists
Soviet scientists
Writers from Ufa